The Champions Hockey League is a European first-level ice hockey tournament. Launched in the 2014–15 season by 26 clubs, 6 leagues and the International Ice Hockey Federation (IIHF), the tournament features top teams across Europe.

Background
The IIHF launched a tournament with the same name in 2008 to coincide with the IIHF's 100th anniversary. The tournament's only season was played between 8 October 2008 and 28 January 2009, and was won by the ZSC Lions who got to play in the 2009 Victoria Cup game as a result. The IIHF planned to launch another season but was ultimately forced to cancel the tournament due to problems finding sponsors during the concurrent global economic crisis and failure to agree on a tournament format. On 9 December 2013, a new tournament with the same name was launched by the IIHF and a group of 26 clubs from six countries, born out of the European Trophy, starting in the 2014–15 season.

Seasons

Overview

Note:
  Some matches had capacity restrictions due to the COVID-19 pandemic.

2014–15 season

The 2014–15 season was played between August 2014 and February 2015. 44 clubs from 12 European countries participated in the season, divided into 11 groups of four teams each. Each team played a double round-robin in their group, for a total of 6 games per team. The 11 group winners as well as the top five group runners-up qualified for the playoffs. The playoffs were as a single-elimination tournament, with all rounds leading to the final played in two-game, home-and-away, total-goal series. The final was a single game. In total, 161 games were played, including the group and playoff stages. The season was won by Luleå HF which defeated Frölunda HC in the final.

2015–16 season

For the 2015–16 season, the tournament was expanded to 48 teams, divided into 16 groups with three teams in each group. The two first teams in each group advanced to the playoff round of 32. The 48 teams consisted of the 26 founding A-licence clubs, 12 B-licensed clubs from the founding leagues, and 10 C-licensed "Wild card" teams from other leagues. In total, 157 games were played. Frölunda HC won their first Champions League title by beating Oulun Kärpät in the final.

2016–17 season

The 2016–17 season was once more played with 48 teams, using the same format as in the previous season. The season started on 16 August 2016 and ended with the final game on 7 February 2017 with Frölunda defeating Sparta Prague, 4–3 in overtime.

2017–18 season

Starting with the fourth CHL season, the championship was reduced to 32 teams, and qualification was on sporting merits only. The six founding leagues were represented by between three and five teams (based on a three-year league ranking), while eight teams from the "challenge leagues" were represented by one team each. No founding team was qualified automatically.

Finnish side JYP Jyväskylä won the title defeating Swedish team Växjö Lakers 2–0.

2018–19 season

The fifth CHL season was competed by 32 teams, and qualification was on sporting merits only. The six founding leagues were represented by between three and five teams (based on a four-year league ranking), while seven "challenge leagues" were represented by one team each. One place was awarded to the Continental Cup champion. Unlike in the first three editions, founding teams did not automatically qualify. The group stages began on 30 August 2018, and ended on 17 October 2018. The season had an average attendance of 3,401 per game, one percent increase from the previous season.

Swedish team Frölunda HC won their third Champions Hockey League title, defeating Red Bull München, the first German team to reach the final, 3–1 at the Scandinavium in Gothenburg.

2019–20 season

The sixth CHL season had 32 teams competing, and qualification was again on sporting merits only. The six founding leagues were represented by between three and five teams (based on a three-year league ranking), while seven "challenge leagues" were represented by one team each. One place was awarded to the champion of the 2018–19 Champions Hockey League as well as a wild card spot selected by the board.

Swedish team Frölunda HC successfully defended their Champions Hockey League title, defeating Czech team Mountfield HK 3–1 in the final to win the European Trophy for a fourth time. For the first time in the history of the league, the final was held in the Czech Republic as Mountfield HK earned the right to host the game at ČPP Arena.

2020–21 season

The season was cancelled due to COVID-19 pandemic in Europe.

2021–22 season

The seventh CHL season had 32 teams competing with qualification being on sporting merits only. The six founding leagues were represented by between three and five teams (based on a three-year league ranking) while seven "challenge leagues" were represented by their national champions. One place was awarded to the champion of the 2019–20 Champions Hockey League as well as two wild card spots selected by the board to replace the national champions of Belarus and Slovakia. The season was marked by participation of the first Ukrainian team, HC Donbass.

Swedish team Rögle BK in their debut season beat Finnish team Tappara 2–1 in the final at their home Catena Arena in Ängelholm to win the European Trophy for the first time.

Teams
Since the 2017–18 season, 32 teams again participate in the group stage, with 24 of the entries coming from the six founding leagues (Swedish Hockey League, Finnish Liiga, Swiss National League A, Czech Extraliga, German DEL and Austrian/international EBEL) and all berths being earned through on-ice achievement: the "founding clubs" are no longer guaranteed a place in the competition. A maximum of five teams from each country are permitted, with the entries allotted to each country according to a coefficient system (best two leagues get five berths, next two get four, last two get three). The remaining eight places are given to the champions of the Norwegian, Slovak, French, Belarusian, Danish, British and Polish leagues, as well as the champion of the Continental Cup. The teams are then drawn into eight groups of four, with the top two teams in each group advancing to the knockout stage, which is contested as two-legged ties until a one-match final.

In the first three years of the competition, the 26 founding teams had guaranteed spots in the group stage ("A license"). Additional teams from the founding league, that qualified based on sporting merits ("B license") and the champions from other European leagues ("C license") completed the field.

League ranking

F founding leagues

Note: It was decided that the 2021–22 season would not be accounted for.

League ranking points calculation
Each match is counted for league ranking points. Points collected by all teams from a specific league are summed up and then divided by number of teams from that league. The final result represents the league's coefficient for that year. Coefficients are then sorted from highest to lowest: the best league gets 100 points with each following getting five points less than previous one (95, 90, 85...).

Points are awarded as follows:
 win in regulation time – 3 points (group stage, playoffs)
 win in overtime – 2 points (group stage only; no overtime in playoffs)
 tie in regulation time – 1 point (playoffs only)
 loss in overtime – 1 point (group stage only)
 loss in regulation time – 0 points (group stage, playoffs)

Additionally, each team is awarded 1 point for reaching each of next rounds.

The last four seasons are taken into account for berth allocation for the 2018–19 season. League points are made of 25% of points won in first season, 50% of points won in second season, 75% of points won in third season and 100% of points won in last, fourth season.

For the 2018–19 season, each of the four previous seasons was taken into account and starting with 2019–20 season each will be based on points from last five seasons.

Records and statistics

Winners

By nation

Prize money
In the 2014–15 season, 40 teams competed for a grand total of 1.5 million euros.

European trophy
The winner of the Competition receives the European Trophy, named after the tournament European Trophy which was a predecessor to the Champions Hockey League.

See also

 European Trophy, a similar tournament played annually from 2006, disbanded after 2013. European Trophy is the precursor to Champions Hockey League. The names of all four recent European Trophy winners are engraved in the Trophy.

References

External links
 

 
International Ice Hockey Federation tournaments
Recurring sporting events established in 2014
European international sports competitions
Multi-national ice hockey leagues in Europe
Multi-national professional sports leagues